Grady Public Schools was a school district with its headquarters in Grady, Arkansas. Its territory is now within the Star City School District.

History
In 2004 the Arkansas Legislature approved a law that forced school districts with fewer than 350 students apiece to consolidate with other districts. In May 2004 the Arkansas Board of Education rejected a voluntary proposal to consolidate the Grady school district with the Gould School District, because both school districts were majority African American and the merger would have violated federal desegregation laws. One week later, the board voted unanimously to merge Grady into the Star City School District. On July 1, 2004, the Grady School District was merged into the Star City district.

Schools
In 1998 the district included an elementary school, a middle school, and a high school. In 2003 the school district had two schools, Grady Elementary School and Grady High School.

References

Further reading
 Map of Arkansas School Districts pre-July 1, 2004
  (Download) - Includes boundaries of the Grady district in the 1950s

External links

 Grady Public Schools (Archive)

Defunct school districts in Arkansas
Education in Lincoln County, Arkansas
2004 disestablishments in Arkansas
School districts disestablished in 2004